Order of the Red Lion and the Sun was established during the reign of Mohammad Reza Shah Pahlavi by the Iranian Red Lion and the Sun Society. This order is bestowed in order to give recognition for humanitarian services rendered in the interests of the Iranian people and for the saving of life.
 
The order consists of a white disc with the emblem of the Iranian Red Lion and the Sun society surrounded with golden arrays and a red cross behind it, representing the Red Cross Society.

This order was in use until the revolution of 1979.

See also
 Lion and Sun
 Order of the Lion and the Sun

References

Medals of the International Red Cross and Red Crescent Movement
Civil awards and decorations of Iran
Awards disestablished in 1979